The Lambda Literary Award for Lesbian Romance is an annual literary award, presented by the Lambda Literary Foundation, to a novel, novella, or short story collection "by a single author that focus on a central love relationship between two or more characters."

Recipients

References 

Lesbian Romance
English-language literary awards
Lists of LGBT-related award winners and nominees